The  is Japanese aerial lift line in Otaru, Hokkaidō, operated by . The company also operates bus terminals, Sapporo Municipal Subway kiosks, and ski resorts. Opened in 1979, the line climbs  with the panoramic view of the city.

Basic data
System: Aerial tramway, 1 track cable and 2 haulage ropes
Cable length: 
Vertical interval: 
Maximum gradient: 27°57′
Operational speed: 3.6 m/s
Passenger capacity per a cabin: 30
Cabins: 2
Stations: 2
Duration of one-way trip: 4 minutes

See also
List of aerial lifts in Japan

External links
 Official website

 

Aerial tramways in Japan
1979 establishments in Japan